"Your Cheatin' Heart" is a song written and recorded by country music singer-songwriter Hank Williams in 1952. It is regarded as one of country's most important standards. Williams was inspired to write the song while driving with his fiancée from Nashville, Tennessee, to Shreveport, Louisiana. After describing his first wife Audrey Sheppard as a "cheatin' heart", in minutes he dictated the lyrics to Billie Jean Jones. Produced by Fred Rose, Williams recorded the song at his last session at Castle Studio in Nashville, Tennessee, on September 23.

"Your Cheatin' Heart" was released in January 1953. Propelled by Hank Williams' recent death during a trip to a New Year's concert in Canton, Ohio, the song became an instant success. It topped Billboard's Country & Western chart for six weeks, with over a million units sold. The success of the song continued with covers by other artists. Joni James' version reached number two on Billboard's Most Played in Jukeboxes the same year, while Ray Charles' 1962 version reached number 29 on the Billboard Hot 100 and 13 on the UK Singles Chart. The song ranked 213 on Rolling Stone's 500 Greatest Songs of All Time, and was ranked number 5 on Country Music Television's 100 Greatest Songs in Country Music.

Background
By 1952, Williams was enjoying a successful streak, releasing multiple hits, including "Honky Tonk Blues", "Half as Much", "Settin' the Woods on Fire", "Jambalaya (On the Bayou)" and "You Win Again". While his career was soaring, his marriage to Audrey Sheppard became turbulent. Already a periodic alcoholic, he developed serious problems with morphine and painkillers prescribed to ease his severe back pain caused by an unsuccessful operation to relieve spina bifida. The couple divorced on May 29. Soon after, Williams met Billie Jean Jones backstage at the Ryman Auditorium, a native of Shreveport, Louisiana, who was, at the time, dating Faron Young. Williams started dating Jones, upon the end of her relationship with Young and soon began to plan their marriage. While driving from Nashville, Tennessee to Shreveport to announce the wedding to her parents, Williams talked to her about his previous marriage and described Audrey Sheppard as a "cheatin' heart",  adding that one day she would "have to pay". Inspired by his line, he instructed Jones to take his notebook and write down the lyrics of the song that he quickly dictated.

Recording and release
Williams recorded the song on September 23 at the Castle Studio in Nashville.  The session, which became Williams' last, also produced the A-side "Kaw-Liga", as well as the songs "I Could Never Be Ashamed of You" and "Take These Chains from My Heart". 
It was produced by Williams' publisher Fred Rose, who made minor arrangements of the lyrics of "Your Cheatin' Heart". Williams described the song to his friend, Braxton Schuffert, as he was about to play it, as "the best heart song (he) ever wrote".  Williams is backed on the session by Tommy Jackson (fiddle), Don Helms (steel guitar), Chet Atkins (lead guitar), Jack Shook (rhythm guitar), and Floyd "Lightnin'" Chance (bass).

While traveling to a scheduled New Year's show in Canton, Ohio, the driver found Williams dead on the back seat of the car during a stop in Oak Hill, West Virginia. "Your Cheatin' Heart" was released at the end of January 1953. Propelled by Williams' death, the song and the A-side "Kaw-Liga" became a hit, selling over a million records.  Billboard initially described the songs as "superlative tunes and performances", emphasizing the sales potential. Within a short time from its release, the song reached number one on Billboard's Top C&W Records, where it remained for six weeks.

Legacy
Released in the wake of his death, the song became synonymous with the myth of Hank Williams as a haunted, lonely figure who expressed pain with an authenticity that became the standard for country music.  The name of the song was used as the title of Hank Williams' 1964 biopic. "Your Cheatin' Heart", as well as other songs by Williams were performed on the movie, with George Hamilton dubbing the soundtrack album recorded by Williams' son, Hank Williams Jr. Country music historian Colin Escott wrote that "the song – for all intents and purposes – defines country music." In the 2003 documentary series Lost Highway, country music historian Ronnie Pugh comments, "It's Hank's anthem, it's his musical last will and testament.  It's searing, it's powerful, it's gripping.  If you want to say this is his last and best work, I wouldn't argue with that."  AllMusic described the track as the "signature song" of Hank Williams, and an "unofficial anthem" of country music. Rolling Stone called it "one of the greatest country standards of all time", ranking it at number 217 on their list of the 500 Greatest Songs of All Time. The song ranked at number 5 in Country Music Television's 100 Greatest Songs in Country Music in 2003,

Two Pepsi Super Bowl commercials featured the song, one aired during Super Bowl XXX, featured Williams' recording while a Coca-Cola deliveryman grabbed a Pepsi. The second one, aired during Super Bowl XLVI, featured the same situation, but with the song covered by Jennifer Nettles of Sugarland. The song forms the title of the 1990 TV drama 'Your Cheatin' Heart' by John Byrne.

Cover versions
A  version of the song by Joni James, released in 1953, reached number 2 on Billboard's Most Played in Jukeboxes. 
In 1953, Frankie Laine's version reached number 18 on the Most Played in Jukeboxes chart. 
In 1962,  a version by Ray Charles reached number 29 on the Billboard Hot 100 and 23 on the R&B chart, while it also charted at number 13 on the UK Singles Chart.
In 1962, Patsy Cline released a version on her third and final studio album Sentimentally Yours. Cline's vocals were overdubbed over a different arrangement for the soundtrack to Cline's biographical movie Sweet Dreams.

Chart performance

Hank Williams

Cover versions

Footnotes

References

Bibliography
 

1952 songs
1953 singles
Hank Williams songs
Songs written by Hank Williams
Patsy Cline songs
Country ballads
Elvis Presley songs
James Brown songs
Jerry Lee Lewis songs
Glen Campbell songs
Songs written by Fred Rose (songwriter)
George Hamilton IV songs
Frankie Laine songs
Crazy Elephant songs
Songs about infidelity
MGM Records singles